Finghall is a village and civil parish in the Richmondshire district of North Yorkshire, England.

History
The village is mentioned in the Domesday Book as Fingall when it belonged to Count Alan and had 13 villagers. The origin of the place-name is from the Old English words Fin, inga and halt meaning a nook of land of the family or followers of a man called Fina. The place-name appears as Finegala in the Domesday Book of 1086 and as Finyngale in 1157.

In the 1820s, Finghall had a population of 126, which had dropped to 111 by 1872 and 99 by 1897. In 2001, the population had risen to 178, and this had decreased to 166 at the 2011 census. Both censuses are for the Finghall parish which includes the hamlet of Akebar. The church is dedicated to St. Andrew. the 12th century church is adjacent to the beck and quite near the A684 road. It is thought that the Medieval village of Fingall was clustered around the church, but was abandoned during a plague.

The village had a railway station on the Wensleydale Railway which opened in the 1850s and closed in 1954. It was re-opened on the heritage Wensleydale Railway in 2004.

Culture and community
The village public house is the Queen's Head. A local legend maintains that the willows that line the beck to the north of the village, of which there is a good view from the dining room and terrace of the pub, are said to have inspired Kenneth Grahame to write The Wind in the Willows.  The village to the east is called Newton-le-Willows.

Famous residents
 Edward Banks (4 January 1770 – 5 July 1835), noted builder (Waterloo Bridge and London Bridge)
 Russ Swift (born 1951), British precision driver.

References

External links

 Constable Burton & Finghall Parish Council Website
 Video footage of Finghall Lane railway station

Villages in North Yorkshire
Civil parishes in North Yorkshire